Studio One is an American anthology drama television series that was adapted from a radio series. It was created in 1947 by Canadian director Fletcher Markle, who came to CBS from the CBC. It premiered on November 7, 1948 and ended on September 29, 1958, with a total of 467 episodes over the course of 10 seasons.

History

Radio

On April 29, 1947, Fletcher Markle launched the 60-minute CBS Radio series with an adaptation of Malcolm Lowry's Under the Volcano. Broadcast on Tuesdays, opposite Fibber McGee and Molly and The Bob Hope Show at 9:30 pm, ET, the radio series continued until July 27, 1948, showcasing such adaptations as Dodsworth, Pride and Prejudice, The Red Badge of Courage, and Ah, Wilderness. Top performers were heard on this series, including John Garfield, Walter Huston, Mercedes McCambridge, Burgess Meredith, and Robert Mitchum.

CBS Radio received a Peabody Award for Studio One in 1947, citing Markle's choice of material and the authenticity of his adaptations "in a production, which at its best, is distinguished for its taste, restraint, and radio craftsmanship".

Move to television

In 1948, Markle made a leap from radio to television. Sponsored by Westinghouse Electric Corporation, the television series was seen on CBS (which Westinghouse later owned between 1995 and 2000), from 1948 through 1958, under several variant titles: Studio One Summer Theatre, Studio One in Hollywood, Summer Theatre, Westinghouse Studio One, and Westinghouse Summer Theatre. It was telecast in black-and-white only.

Offering a wide range of dramas, Studio One received Emmy nominations every year from 1950 to 1958. The series staged some notable and memorable teleplays among its 467 episodes. Some created such an impact, they were adapted into theatrical films. William Templeton's 1953 adaptation of George Orwell's novel Nineteen Eighty-Four, starring Eddie Albert as Winston Smith, led to the 1956 feature-film version with Edmond O'Brien in the principal role. Reginald Rose's drama "Twelve Angry Men", about the conflicts of jurors deciding a murder case, originated on Studio One on September 20, 1954; and the 1957 motion picture remake with Henry Fonda was nominated for three Academy Awards. Sal Mineo had the title role in the January 2, 1956, episode of Reginald Rose's "Dino", and he reprised the role for the film Dino (1957).

In 1954, "Crime at Blossoms", scripted by Jerome Ross, was given an Edgar Award for Best Episode in a TV Series. Nathaniel Hawthorne's granddaughter received a plaque in recognition of her grandfather's writing achievements during the April 3, 1950 telecast of The Scarlet Letter. "The Night America Trembled" was Studio Ones September 9, 1957 top-rated television recreation of Orson Welles' October 30, 1938 radio broadcast of The War of the Worlds. The cast included Alexander Scourby, Ed Asner (credited as Edward Asner), and Vincent Gardenia; James Coburn (credited as Jim Coburn), Warren Beatty and Warren Oates all made their television debuts in bit parts. John Astin appeared uncredited as a reporter.

Another notable presentation was an adaptation in 1952 of a medieval mystery play about the Nativity of Jesus, "The Nativity", based on the Chester and York Mystery Plays of the 14th and 15th centuries, reworked into Elizabethan English. With musical accompaniment by the Robert Shaw Chorale, and presented during the Christmas season of 1952, this was one of the few medieval mystery plays telecast on commercial network television. The cast included Thomas Hardie Chalmers, Miriam Wolfe, Hurd Hatfield, and Paul Tripp.

During the 1953 presentation "Dry Run", whole sections of a submarine were built inside the studio, and the entire cast was nearly electrocuted when water that was being used for special effects got very close to power cables.

Worthington Miner, Martin Manulis, and others produced. As the official commercial spokeswoman for Westinghouse, Betty Furness became strongly identified with the Westinghouse products she advertised and demonstrated during the commercial breaks, and she was also seen as an actress in eight Studio One dramas. The show's musical directors were Milton C. Anderson, who also created music for Playhouse 90, and Eugene Cines. The show's musical orchestra was also directed in several episodes during the 1950s by Alfredo Antonini. The show's run ended when Westinghouse switched its sponsorship to the Westinghouse Desilu Playhouse, which premiered in 1958. The series finished at number 24 in the Nielsen ratings for the 1950–1951 season.

Episodes

Lost episode
For years, the second half of the original TV production of Twelve Angry Men was considered lost. However, in 2003, Joseph Consentino, a researcher-producer for The History Channel, discovered a complete kinescope of the Studio One production in the home of the late New York defense attorney (and later judge) Samuel Leibowitz. Consentino was researching a History Channel documentary about Leibowitz, and the discovery was announced by the Museum of Television & Radio (now The Paley Center for Media).

A third-season episode of the ABC legal drama Boston Legal, "Son of the Defender", used clips from the two-part Studio One episode "The Defender" (February 25 – March 4, 1957), featuring William Shatner as an attorney joining his lawyer father, played by Ralph Bellamy, in the defense of a 19-year-old, played by Steve McQueen, who is accused of murder. Utilizing clips of the older show for flashbacks, the Boston Legal episode portrayed Shatner's Studio One character as a young Denny Crane trying his first case alongside his father.

Many Studio One episodes are available for viewing at the Paley Center for Media in New York City and Los Angeles, and some are available through Amazon Prime Video.

Awards and nominations

Home media
In 2008, Koch Vision released the Studio One Anthology with 17 episodes. The episodes contain the original Westinghouse commercials. Bonus features include the "Studio One Seminar" from the Paley Center for Media; an interview with director Paul Nickell, footage from the Archive of American Television and a featurette on the series.

The episode "Twelve Angry Men" is also included as a bonus on the Criterion Collection DVD and Blu-ray releases of the 1957 film.

Amazon.com is also issuing several made-to-order DVDs of episodes not included in the Koch Vision Anthology.

References

External links

 
 Studio One production files, 1948–1955, held by the Billy Rose Theatre Division, New York Public Library for the Performing Arts
 Thousand Oaks Library: Fletcher Markle Collection
 Jerry Haendiges Vintage Radio Logs: Studio One
 "Writing for Television" by Rod Serling
 Studio One at CVTA with episode lists

Watch 
  Studio One (September 29, 1952): Westinghouse spokeswoman Betty Furness explains UHF and demonstrates the UHF adapter
 Studio One (May 18, 1953): Opening scenes of "The Laughmaker" with Jackie Gleason and Art Carney

Listen to 
 Wisconsin Public Radio; Studio One: Babbitt
 

CBS original programming
CBS Radio programs
1948 American television series debuts
1958 American television series endings
1940s American radio programs
1940s American anthology television series
1950s American anthology television series
American radio dramas
Television series based on radio series
1940s American drama television series
1950s American drama television series
Black-and-white American television shows
Edgar Award-winning works
English-language television shows
Television series by CBS Studios
Primetime Emmy Award for Outstanding Drama Series winners
Peabody Award-winning radio programs
Studio One
Anthology radio series